San Víctor is a municipality (municipio) of the Espaillat Province in the Dominican Republic. The District Municipality became a municipality on May 23, 2013.

As of the 2012 census estimate, the municipality, then a municipal district of the Moca municipality, had 79,851 inhabitants; 32,501 living in the city itself, and 47,350 in its rural districts (secciones).

References

Populated places in Espaillat Province
Municipalities of the Dominican Republic